Jo Soo-haeng (born 30 August 1993) is a South Korean professional baseball outfielder for the Doosan Bears of the KBO League. He graduated from Konkuk University and was selected to Doosan Bears by a draft in 2016 (2nd draft, 1st round). In 2018, he changed back number from No.9 to No.51.

References

External links 

 Career statistics and player information from the KBO League
 Jo Soo-haeng at Doosan Bears Baseball Club

Living people
KBO League outfielders
Doosan Bears players
1993 births
People from Gangneung